Alekseyev Central Hydrofoil Design Bureau is a company based in Nizhniy Novgorod, Russia. It was named after Rostislav Alexeyev.

This design bureau has been designing hydrofoils, air cushion craft, and air cavity vessels for many years. It designed and manufactured several designs for wing-in-ground-effect vehicles, including the 400-ton Lun-class ekranoplan, 140-ton A-90 Orlyonok, and 20-ton Utka.

Vehicles 
А-080-752
Spasatel
А-300-538
A-90 Orlyonok
Lun-class ekranoplan
Utka

References

External links
 Official website

 
Aircraft manufacturers of Russia
Companies based in Nizhny Novgorod
Ministry of the Shipbuilding Industry (Soviet Union)
Defence companies of the Soviet Union
Design bureaus